Eois nigriceps is a moth in the  family Geometridae. It is found in Peru.

The wingspan is about 30 mm. The forewings are wood-brown with dark grey lines, all swollen laterally on the costa into blackish coalescent blotches, so that the costal area appears dark. The hindwings are pale fawn, speckled with dark grey.

References

Moths described in 1907
Taxa named by William Warren (entomologist)
Eois
Moths of South America